Share International Foundation is a non-profit organization in London founded by Benjamin Creme (1922–2016) with sister organizations in Amsterdam, Tokyo, and Berkeley, California.

With the founding of Share International, Benjamin Creme aimed to create a group that would help accelerate the evolutionary trajectory of Humanity.  For Creme, the true focus of evolution was enhancing human consciousness.  Creme also underscored that an individual's journey towards self-perfectment involves working on self-mastery and right human relations.  While Creme's understanding emerged out of the writings of The Ageless Wisdom Teachings (a synthesis of philosophical thought, diverse religions, science, and esotericism), he focused on bringing together volunteers to perform a practical, yet spiritual, task.  From their 'about us' page, Share International describes the group's members as: "A worldwide network of individuals... whose purpose is to make known the fact that Maitreya ― the World Teacher for the coming age ― and his group, the Masters of Wisdom, are now among us..."

According to Share International, Maitreya, a great Avatar (which means "coming down from far away" in Sanskrit), has been living among the Asian community in London since 19 July 1977, and presently is in the process of emerging publicly worldwide.  Cyclically, throughout human history, enlightened teachers have been sent down to provide succor to a suffering world.  During the Emergence, Maitreya is making his presence known throughout a world beset with crises ― in response to Humanity's pleas, and in accordance with divine law.

Beliefs, practices and background

Benjamin Creme was a student of the esoteric teachings of Alice Bailey, Helena Blavatsky and Helena Roerich.  Share International's lectures and publications further these authors' ideas about Maitreya (meaning "friendly" in Sanskrit).  According to the Ageless Wisdom Teachings, the Advent of Maitreya fulfills not only Buddhist prophecies about the appearance of a future great teacher named Maitreya, but also the prophecies of a number of other world religions ― including Christianity (the second coming of Christ), Hinduism (the Kalki avatar of Vishnu), Islam (the Imam Mahdi) and Judaism (the Jewish Messiah). Creme claimed that Maitreya was actually Jesus's teacher, and Maitreya manifested through (or overshadowed) Jesus 2,000 years ago.  Moreover, Maitreya's Emergence is claimed to be a gradual and supremely intentional process, as Maitreya and the Masters of Wisdom strive not to infringe Humanity's free will (I.e., our freedom to learn from our mistakes — or to repeat them).

In 1974, Benjamin Creme began teaching "Transmission Meditation", offering it as a means of pooling positive, spiritual energy for the benefit of Humanity. In Transmission Meditation, groups sit silently receiving spiritual energy 'stepped-down' and transmitted through them by the Masters of Wisdom (also called by some groups Ascended Masters). This group meditation is both a means of accelerating one's spiritual development and a form of service, in contrast to other types of meditation that focus solely on relaxation, physical restoration, mitigating stress or optimizing cognition. Transmission Meditation is a non-denominational meditation, and Share International reports that there are over 600 Transmission Meditation groups worldwide.

Creme was generally reluctant to share the exact details about Maitreya’s appearances on television and elsewhere―as he stated that Maitreya discouraged people from chasing after him, and that no one could own him. Nonetheless, Creme confirmed that on 11 June 1988, Maitreya had appeared before 6000 Kenyans in an outdoor church where he spoke perfect Swahili for 18 minutes before disappearing, as had been reported in the Kenya Times. (Both CNN and the BBC reported on this event, including the fact that many miraculous healings occurred there). Since then, Share International has contended that Maitreya has made many more appearances, including before gatherings of orthodox religious groups worldwide. Maitreya also apparently created healing springs of water in the areas near some of these appearances (e.g., in Mexico, Germany, and India); these healing waters have drawn millions of visitors.

Maitreya and the Press

Creme maintained that Maitreya descended from his ancient retreat in the Himalayas in 1977 and relocated to the Indian-Pakistani community of the Brick Lane area. While journalists were invited to find Maitreya in the Brick Lane area, they failed to do so.

In the spring of 1982, Creme held a press conference in Los Angeles, California. Afterwards, Creme wrote: "It was hoped that the media would respond to my information at a level which would allow Him to come forward to them. This hope, however, was not fulfilled. While the media did show an interest in the reappearance story, it did not go so far as to actually get involved in searching for Maitreya."

According to Creme, focus was placed on the media as "the media represent Humanity".
Purportedly, in January 1986, Maitreya contacted media representatives at the highest level in Britain, who agreed to make an announcement about Maitreya's stature, and that he was living in the Asian community of London. Under pressure from high religious and government officials, however, this statement was withheld. 
In 1997 Creme made similar announcements that there would be imminent global TV broadcasts from Maitreya, though with far less media interest. Over the years, Creme attested that Maitreya has been working behind the scenes to galvanize humanity, influencing such events as the ending of the Cold War and German reunification, as well as the ending of apartheid in South Africa.

Then on 12 December 2008, Creme announced that a very bright luminary or star-like object was appearing in the sky, heralding the Return of the Christ, much as the Star of Bethlehem did when Jesus was born.  (Creme underscored that neither of these were stars, as stars do not suddenly appear nor move.  Rather he insisted that they were actual spaceships that changed place and displayed vibrant, undulating colors.) Over an eight-year period, photos of such star-like luminaries were taken around the world and shared widely over the internet. 

On 14 January 2010, Creme reported that Maitreya had given his first television interview "on a major US television network, inaugurating his public work." During these series of interviews in 2010, he had not been introduced as Maitreya or the World's teacher but merely as an ordinary man who was proposing practical solutions to pressing global problems.

Creme continued until his death in October 2016 to assert that Maitreya's full, public emergence was imminent. Creme never received any money for this work nor royalties from his 14 books; for over 30 years, Creme gave free public lectures internationally, while his worldwide network of volunteers also shared information about the Emergence. Share International Foundation continues to maintain that Maitreya's interviews will eventually lead to an international press conference and, ultimately, Maitreya's "Day of Declaration" when he will reveal his true identity.

Main priorities of Maitreya and the idea of sharing

Share International does not claim Maitreya as a religious leader, nor that he comes to found a new religion, but that he is a teacher and guide for individuals and groups everywhere, regardless of whether people self-identify as religious, spiritual, or atheist.  Share International underscores that despite the great political, economic and social upheavals that characterize our time, Maitreya has confidence in humanity's ability to resolve its problems through something that has not been attempted on a wide scale before, through sharing.  After the "Day of Declaration", the group contends that Maitreya will call to action people everywhere to save the hundreds of millions who are hungry and starving in a world where there are food surpluses, where food is hoarded to inflate prices, and where a great amount of food is wasted. Maitreya's solutions include convincing mankind that there must be a shift in priorities ― such that adequate food, housing, clothing, education, and medical care be deemed universal human rights.  Maitreya states, "Take your brother's need as the measure of your actions and solve the problems of the world. There is no other course."

Before his death, Benjamin Creme published a book of 140 messages that he attributed to Maitreya.  These messages were communicated through Creme via a process called "mental overshadowing".  On 31 January 1978, Creme voiced this message he attributed to Maitreya:   "My task is a simple one: to show you the way. You, my friends, have the difficult task of building a New World, a New Country, a New Truth; but together we shall triumph".  Maitreya is said to emphasize sharing because it is an expression of God's love:  Sharing fosters trust, enables healing, and enhances the perception of brotherhood around the world.

Share International magazine

Share International publishes a monthly magazine, also called Share International.  In it, Creme would publish a number of articles that he claimed were dictated to him telepathically by a Master of Wisdom (Ascended Masters), an enlightened being who is described as someone who has already passed through 5 Initiations of spiritual development on this planet and achieved self-mastery. Share International asserts that: the Masters of Wisdom have long watched lovingly over Humanity; and that the Masters unceasingly work behind the scenes to guide the "Group of New World Servers" on behalf of all of Humanity's spiritual evolution.  As the Theosophists who came before them, Share International refers to "the Group of New World Servers" as certain artists, writers, scientists, leaders, inventors and philanthropists, as well as all of those who make great personal sacrifices, both known and unknown. 

Share International magazine brings together ancient ways of knowing and contemporary thinking.  It considers the causes underlying social, economic, political, and spiritual changes now occurring on a global scale, while seeking to inspire practical and compassionate action, such as activism, social justice, integrous journalism, as well as planetary healing.

Reception and criticisms
According to the American religious scholar J. Gordon Melton, Creme's statements served as a catalyst for assessment of the New Age movement by Evangelical Christians. A week after the advertisements in 1982, other advertisements appeared in the Los Angeles Times denouncing Creme as an instrument of the Antichrist. Constance Cumbey (an Evangelical Christian and a Detroit area attorney and author) holds that "Maitreya" is a pseudonym for the  Antichrist and regards Share International as an openly Luciferian movement.
Other Christian Evangelicals distanced themselves from  Cumbey's conspiracy theory. In response to such kinds of excoriating critiques, Creme stated merely, "There is no doubt that there will be opposition from the more privileged members of society who will see, in the changes which must ensue, a loss of their traditional status and power; but the need for change will become so overwhelmingly obvious, that they will find themselves increasingly powerless to stop the momentum.  The present caste system must go, in the interests of the One Humanity."

British journalist Mick Brown wrote "I came to enjoy my talks with Mr. Creme. His stories of the Hierarchy, of hidden retreats in Tibet, of... the cogs... guiding the planet towards an age of harmony and enlightenment ..." He described Creme's claims as fantastic and outlandish. Yet during his long life, Creme weathered such critiques, responding, "We are moving into a period of climax, leading to events which will fundamentally alter life as we know it. Tremendous changes are taking place in all departments of life, prepatory to the establishment of entirely new modes of social living and relationship, based on sharing and co-operation.  To some people, this portends the Second Coming of the Christ.  To others, it is the realization that only through a profound inner change and readiness for a new direction in our political, economic, and social life can humanity survive. Is it not possible that both of these approaches are correct?"

See also
 Ascended masters
 Maitreya (Theosophy)
 Master Jesus
 Theosophy
 Aetherius Society
 Unarius Academy of Science

Notes

References
 Barrett, David V. The New Believers 2001 
 Brown, Mick. The Spiritual Tourist, Bloomsbury publishing, 1998.
 Groothuis, Douglas R. Unmasking the New Age 1986, Inter-Varsity Press, page 120
 Melton J. Gordon, Gale Research Inc, Jerome Clark, Aidan A. Kelly Original from the University of Michigan, New Age Encyclopedia, 1990, entry nr. 96, pages 135-137
 Nagel, Alexandra De Sai Paradox: Tegenstrijdigheden van en rondom Sathya Sai Baba/The Sai paradox: contradictions of and surrounding Sathya Sai Baba in the series Religieuze Bewegingen in Nederland/Religious movements in the Netherlands, 'Sekten/Cults, 1994, nr. 29. published by Free university of Amsterdam press, Dutch language

Further reading
 Cumbey, Constance Hidden Dangers of the Rainbow: The New Age Movement and Our Coming Age of Barbarism, Huntington House Publishers 1985, 
 Brown, Mick. "Messiah is alive and well and in London." The Sunday Times, 23 October 1988, p. A15.
 Peterson, Wayne S. Extraordinary Times, Extraordinary Beings: Experiences of an American Diplomat with Maitreya and the Masters of Wisdom'', Hampton Roads Publishing Company, 2003, 
 See books by Benjamin Creme

External links
 Official international website

New Age organizations
Religious organisations based in the Netherlands
Theosophy
World government